The Akademos Rally is an annual car rally held in Victoria, Australia, by the Melbourne University Car Club. The event had its origins in 1961. The name was coined by the then-head of Motorsport in Australia as an amalgam of academic (Akadem) and motorsport (mos).

The event is a round of the Victorian Rally Championship. The Akademos Rally is a CAMS-permitted event. As of the 2005 event, held in Alexandra, the event allows competitors to use pacenotes. Prior to 2005, the event was run as a "blind" event, where competitors are not allowed to view the course in the preceding six weeks.

Rally competitions in Australia